Gardner-Serpollet was a French manufacturer of steam-powered cars in the early 20th century. Léon Serpollet is credited with inventing and perfecting the flash boiler in the late 1800s.

Serpollet produced his own automobiles under the name Serpollet and Gardner-Serpollet until his death in 1907.

Origins
Léon Serpollet was born in the Ain department of France, and went on to establish his factory with his brother Henri on the rue des Cloÿs in the 18th arrondissement of Paris, a location that has become the Parc Léon Serpollet today. In 1886 the brothers formed La Société des Moteurs Serpollet Frères in Montmartre.

Flash boiler
Leon Serpollet and his brother Henri, early French steam car pioneers, worked together to perfect the flash tube boiler that introduced an efficient and new way to produce steam. The exact date that their innovative system was first built appears to be unknown, but after further development it went on to make steam power in an automobile more practical because of its advanced design and quick steam output. They made a steam tricycle in the late eighteen-eighties to test the steam engines and it soon convinced others of the merit of the design.  

In 1896 Léon Serpollet patented the flash boiler, which made steam a much more practical source of power for an automobile. The oil-fired flash boiler fed steam to a very advanced four-cylinder enclosed engine similar to the contemporary petrol engine design including poppet valves and an enclosed crankcase.

1894 Paris-Rouen
On July 22, 1894 four Serpollet vehicles competed in the Le Petit Journal Contest for Horseless Carriages from Paris to Rouen. Maurice Le Blant finished 14th and Ernest Archdeacon finished 16th, but 'De Prandiéres' and Étienne le Blant stopped en route.

Gardner-Serpollet formed
In 1898 the brothers met Frank Gardner, a wealthy American. They formed the Gardner-Serpollet Company which began producing cars in 1900.  

A 1903 Gardner-Serpollet is on display at Larz Anderson Auto Museum in Brookline, Massachusetts.

The Easter Egg 
Besides being an inventor and manufacturer, Leon Serpollet became the first driver of a non-electrically powered car to hold the Land Speed Record.

References

External links

 Land Speed Record

Vehicle manufacturing companies established in 1886
1886 establishments in France
Brass Era vehicles
1900s cars
Defunct motor vehicle manufacturers of France
Steam cars
Manufacturing companies based in Paris
Vehicle manufacturing companies disestablished in 1907
1907 disestablishments in France